Blackstone is a town in Worcester County, Massachusetts, United States. The population was 9,208 at the 2020 census.  It is a part of the Providence metropolitan area.

History 
This region was first inhabited by the Nipmuc. Blackstone was settled by European immigrants in 1662 and was incorporated in 1845.  The town was part of Mendon, Massachusetts, before becoming a separate municipality. Blackstone is within the area of the John H. Chaffee Blackstone River Valley National Heritage Corridor of Massachusetts and Rhode Island.

Geography
The Blackstone River, birthplace of the Industrial Revolution in the United States,
meanders west to southeast, on the south border of town.

The town is bordered by North Smithfield, Rhode Island and Woonsocket, Rhode Island to the south; Millville, Massachusetts to the west; Mendon, Massachusetts to the north, and Bellingham, Massachusetts (Norfolk County) to the east.

Named places in the town include:

 Blackstone Village
 Central Village
 East Blackstone
 Farnum's Gate
 Five Corners
 High Rocks
 Millerville
 New City
 Privilege
 Rural District
 Waterford
 Wheelockville
 Woonsocket Junction (New York and New England Railroad junction)

An East Blackstone railroad station used to be located in Bellingham.

Demographics

As of the census of 2000, there were 8,804 people, 3,235 households, and 2,355 families residing in the town. The racial makeup of the town was 97.39% White, 0.33% African American, 0.24% Native American, 0.76% Asian, 0.01% Pacific Islander, 0.24% from other races, and 1.03% from two or more races. Hispanic or Latino of any race were 1.03% of the population.

There were 3,235 households, out of which 38.2% had children under the age of 18 living with them, 58.9% were married couples living together, 9.9% had a female householder with no husband present, and 27.2% were non-families. 22.4% of all households were made up of individuals, and 8.5% had someone living alone who was 65 years of age or older.  The average household size was 2.71 and the average family size was 3.20.

In the town, the population was spread out, with 27.7% under the age of 18, 7.5% from 18 to 24, 33.7% from 25 to 44, 20.9% from 45 to 64, and 10.1% who were 65 years of age or older.  The median age was 35 years. For every 100 females, there were 98.2 males.  For every 100 females age 18 and over, there were 94.5 males.

The median income for a household in the town was $55,163, and the median income for a family was $61,633. Males had a median income of $42,100 versus $27,448 for females. The per capita income for the town was $20,936.  About 1.8% of families and 3.7% of the population were below the poverty line, including 2.2% of those under age 18 and 12.0% of those age 65 or over.

Education
Blackstone, being part of the broader Blackstone-Millville Regional School District, is home to the Blackstone-Millville Regional High School, serving both the town of Blackstone and its western neighbor, Millville. 

In 2003, a new middle school was constructed, the Frederick W. Hartnett Middle School, named after former superintendent of schools, Fred Hartnett. Blackstone is also home to the Augustine F. Maloney Elementary School, and to the John F. Kennedy Elementary School.

Adjacent city and towns
 Woonsocket, Rhode Island
 Millville, Massachusetts
 North Smithfield, Rhode Island
 Mendon, Massachusetts
 Bellingham, Massachusetts

Government

Notable people

 Con Daily, baseball player
 Bob Stewart, baseball umpire
 Fernand St. Germain, politician

References

External links

Blackstone official website

 
Towns in Worcester County, Massachusetts
Towns in Massachusetts